Jungil Hong also known as Jung-li Hong (born in 1976) is a Korean-American artist based in Providence, Rhode Island. She is best known for her psychedelic, cartoon-inspired silkscreen poster art and paintings. More recently she has expanded into textiles.

Early life and education 
Hong moved to Providence, Rhode Island in 1995 in order to attend Rhode Island School of Design (RISD) and that same year taking up residency Fort Thunder. Hong, with Lightning Bolt drummer/frontman Brian Chippendale, and musician and artist Mat Brinkman worked on pioneering an art movement between the mid 1990s to early 2000s in Providence, sometimes referred to as the "Providence/RISD" scene.

Hong received her B.F.A. degree in 1999 in ceramics and her M.F.A. degree in 2015 in textiles from Rhode Island School of Design (RISD).

Work 
She has won scholarships to the Penland School of Arts and Crafts, Haystack Mountain School of Crafts, and Watershed Center for Ceramic Arts. She has won the 2006 Rhode Island State Council of the Arts (RISCA) Fellowship Merit Awards in the Drawing and Printmaking and Crafts categories. She was selected for the 2007 deCordova Annual award, from deCordova Museum and Sculpture Park.

Her work has been shown at Gallery Agniel in Providence, MASS MoCA, the New Image Art Gallery in West Hollywood, Space 1026 in Philadelphia, The Museum of the Rhode Island School of Design, International Print Center New York (IPCNY), Florsitree Space in Baltimore, A.I.R. Gallery, New York, Cinders Gallery, New York, The Rhode Island Foundation Gallery, Limner Gallery, New York, Las Sucias Studio, Brooklyn, and the Cheongju Craft Museum, Cheongju, Korea.

Hong currently shares a large industrial studio space in Providence with her husband, Brian Chippendale, that they call the "Hilarious Attic". Together the couple has a son.

References

External links
Official Webpage

Living people
American artists
South Korean artists
1976 births
South Korean emigrants to the United States
Artists from Rhode Island
Rhode Island School of Design alumni
American poster artists
South Korean poster artists
21st-century American artists
21st-century American women artists
21st-century South Korean artists